Thomas Jones (by 1492 – 1558/59) was a Welsh politician.

He was a Member (MP) of the Parliament of England for Pembrokeshire in 1542 and 1547 and for Carmarthenshire in 1558.

References

15th-century births
1559 deaths
16th-century Welsh politicians
Members of the Parliament of England (pre-1707) for constituencies in Wales
English MPs 1542–1544
English MPs 1547–1552
English MPs 1558